Snapdeal is an Indian e-commerce company, based in New Delhi, India. It was founded in February 2010 by Kunal Bahl and Rohit Bansal.

Snapdeal was one of the largest online marketplaces in India. Snapdeal targets the value e-commerce segment, which Bahl estimated to be three times larger than the branded goods market.

Fashion, home and general merchandise account for a majority of the products sold by over 500,000 sellers on Snapdeal. Buyers from more than 3,700 towns in India shop on Snapdeal.

History

Establishment 
Snapdeal was founded on 4 February 2010 as a daily deals platform, before expanding to become an online marketplace in October 2011.

Unsuccessful merger with Flipkart 
Reports emerged in Q2 2016 that SoftBank Group planned to engineer a merger between Snapdeal and Flipkart. Discussions took place for months, but concluded in July 2017 after the deal fell through due to lack of consensus among Snapdeal's board members. Disagreements over valuation and proposed special payouts to early investors—Nexus Venture Partners and Kalaari Capital—were among the reasons cited.

Snapdeal 2.0 
Following the unsuccessful plan to merge with Flipkart, Snapdeal pursued a new strategy it called Snapdeal 2.0. The initiative saw the sale of non-core businesses—Freecharge and Vulcan Express—to dedicate more resources to Snapdeal's e-commerce marketplace, which is its core business. 

The strategy yielded strong results. From 2017 to 2021, Snapdeal's revenue grew by 74% at its peak, while losses were cut by nearly 95%. Between the financial years in 2018 and 2020, the number of unique customers on Snapdeal's platform also tripled to 27 million. More than 90% of Snapdeal's orders came from non-metro users.

Under Snapdeal 2.0, the company built an asset-light operating model designed specifically to serve the value e-commerce segment, including decentralised logistics and minimal inventory, keeping operating costs low.

Part of the strategy's success is derived from recreating the bustling and diverse experiences of India's bazaars online. To sell products to non-metro buyers, Snapdeal identified a need to engage and entertain, just like in physical bricks-and-mortar settings. In February 2021, Bahl shared in an interview with KrASIA that "Snapdeal's engagement with this new and a large part of our existing user base is built on three key themes of video, voice, and vernacular. All these initiatives are built around the central idea of how we can help our users discover and transact better, rather than a traditional approach of how we can sell better."

Snapdeal's focus on the value e-commerce segment has led Indian FMCG companies such as Godrej and Himalaya to use its platform to sell their brand products. The companies have made arrangements to sell their products directly on the platform through authorised dealers. Other brands such as The Man Company, Mamaearth, and Ustraa have also partnered with Snapdeal to reach customers from non-metro regions.

Miscellaneous

Diwali campaign with Aamir Khan 
In March 2015, Snapdeal engaged actor Aamir Khan to promote its website in India with its Diwali campaign, "Dil Ki Deal. The year-long campaign stirred controversy due to comments made by Khan in his personal capacity.

Reported sales of counterfeit products 
In January 2021, the Office of the United States Trade Representative (USTR) released a 2020 report that identified Snapdeal as a marketplace where counterfeit products are sold (a notorious market), it had been listed by the USTR since 2019. Snapdeal responded that the report "reflected a blinkered and flawed view of the world that not only fails to make a distinction between the respective roles of brands, sellers and platforms, but also wilfully ignores the applicable laws in various jurisdictions, including in India". Snapdeal also sent a notice to the USTR asking for the statements made in the report to be retracted, and for a corrigendum to be issued. It was subsequently dropped from the 2021 USTR notorious markets report, released in 2022. Snapdeal is a member of the International Trademark Association (INTA), which has over 7200 members from 187 countries that pledge to protect intellectual property on online marketplaces.

Open Network for Digital Commerce 
In July 2022, reports emerged that Snapdeal will debut on the government-led Open Network for Digital Commerce (ONDC), which would make it the first e-commerce marketplace to do so. Snapdeal will launch on the network under three categories: fashion, home, personal and beauty care.

Funding and acquisitions

Fundraising 
Snapdeal has completed multiple rounds of funding.

It received its first investment in January 2011, amounting to US$12 million from Nexus Venture Partners and Indo-US Venture Partners. Another round was done in July 2011 for funds amounting to US$45 million, from Bessemer Venture Partners and existing investors. A third round of funding worth US$50 million was completed the same year, from eBay and existing investors.

In February 2014, Snapdeal raised US$133 million in a round led by eBay together with Kalaari Capital, Nexus Venture Partners, Bessemer Venture Partners, Intel Capital and Saama Capital. The following month, it raised an additional US$105 million from BlackRock, Temasek Holdings, PremjiInvest and others. SoftBank also invested US$647 million in October 2014, making it the largest shareholder in Snapdeal.

In August 2015, Alibaba Group, Foxconn and SoftBank invested US$500 million in Snapdeal. In February of the following year, Ontario Teachers' Pension Plan and Brother Fortune Apparel injected US$200 million in funds into Snapdeal at a valuation of US$6.5 billion. The completion of the investment coincided with new appointments to Snapdeal's leadership team, including Anand Chandrasekaran (from Airtel), Jayant Sood (from Airtel), Rajiv Mangla (from Adobe), and more.

In May 2017, Snapdeal raised funding worth ₹113 crore from Nexus Venture Partners.

In December 2021, it was reported that Snapdeal is planning to raise US$250 million in an initial public offering (IPO). Snapdeal also announced that it intends to enter the offline retail space in smaller Indian cities.

Acquisitions 
In June 2010, Snapdeal's holding company Jasper Infotech acquired Bengaluru-based group buying website Grabbon.com for an undisclosed amount. 

In April 2012, Delhi-based online sports goods retailer eSportsBuy.com was acquired. This was followed by the acquisition of Shopo.in in 2013, which is a customer-to-customer (C2C) e-commerce platform. 

In 2014, Snapdeal acquired Doozton, a fashion product discovery technology platform, and Wishpicker, a technology platform that uses machine learning to deliver recommendations for gift purchases. Both deals were completed for undisclosed amounts.

Snapdeal made multiple acquisitions in 2015, acquiring a stake in product comparison website Smartprix in January, before acquiring a discovery site for luxury fashion products, Exclusively.in. Two months later, it acquired a 20% stake in logistics service company GoJavas as well as e-commerce solution provider Unicommerce, and financial transaction platform RupeePower. In April 2015, mobile payments company Freecharge was acquired by Snapdeal. Programmatic display advertising platform Reduce Data was also acquired in September of the same year.

In August 2016, logistics firm Pigeon Express acquired a 51% stake in GoJavas with Snapdeal holding 49% stake in the firm. Snapdeal later exited GoJavas.

See also 
 E-commerce in India
 Online shopping
 Retail

References

External links
 

Companies based in Delhi
Online marketplaces of India
Privately held companies of India
2010 establishments in Delhi
Retail companies established in 2010
Internet properties established in 2010
Indian brands
Multilingual websites
Softbank portfolio companies
Notorious markets